Major General (R) Muhammad Anwar Khan', (born 9 May 1945 in Dera Sadozai, Poonch District, Kashmir and Jammu, British India) is a career soldier and politician who served as the President of Azad Jammu & Kashmir 25 August 2001 to 23 August 2006. He was replaced by Raja Zulqarnain Khan. He belonged to an elite Sudhan family. His efforts to bring Army Public School in Taien brought useful result in 2021 when APS Taien started it's educational functionality as National Obligation. He Died on 19th January 2023 & His Funeral was offered in Army Race Course Graveyard on 20th January 2023. Many officials from Pak Army attended the Funeral .

Education and career 
Sardar Anwar Khan received his early education from the village Tain and then got recruited in Pakistan Air Force on 7 Jan 1963 and was allotted Pak 66705. He served until October 1966 until he was selected for commission in the Pakistan Army. On 15 April 1967, he was commissioned in the Azad Kashmir Regiment. He is a graduate of the Command and Staff College, Quetta, Pakistan Navy Staff College, Karachi and National Defence College, Rawalpindi. He also attended the U.S. Army War College in Pennsylvania and received a Master's Degree in War Studies.

During a span of 35 years of a distinguished Army career, he held various important commands of staff and instructional appointments. He commanded two infantry battalions, a brigade and as Major General commanded two infantry divisions. As a young officer he also actively participated in 1971 war in the Kashmir Sector. He made significant contribution to the leadership development within the Pakistan Army as an Instructor at the Pakistan Military Academy, School of Infantry and Tactics, Command and Staff College, Quetta and as the Chief Instructor at National Defence College, Islamabad from December 1996 to December 1998. He retired from the army as Vice Chief of General Staff (VCGS) in July 2001. He also served as the colonel commandant of Azad Kashmir Regiment till April 2003.

He is married and has three sons and two daughters.His son Col Adnan Anwar is also serving in pak army.

References

External links
 Profile of the AJK President

1945 births
Living people
Pakistani generals
Pahari Pothwari people
People from Poonch District, Pakistan
Politicians from Azad Kashmir
Presidents of Azad Kashmir
United States Army War College alumni